This is a list of 121 species in Gyrophaena, a genus of rove beetles in the family Staphylinidae.

Gyrophaena species

 Gyrophaena affinis C. Sahlberg, 1834 i c g
 Gyrophaena alligatrix Pace, 2007 g
 Gyrophaena anguiculus Pace, 2007 g
 Gyrophaena angustata (Stephens, 1832) g
 Gyrophaena anmamontis Pace, 2007 g
 Gyrophaena antennalis Casey, 1906 i c g
 Gyrophaena arcus Pace, 2007 g
 Gyrophaena arizonae Seevers, 1951 i c g
 Gyrophaena atropatena Enushchenko g
 Gyrophaena barberi Seevers, 1951 i c g
 Gyrophaena bihamata Thomson, 1867 g
 Gyrophaena bilobata Seevers, 1951 i c g
 Gyrophaena blackwelderi Seevers, 1951 i c g
 Gyrophaena blatchleyi Seevers, 1951 i c g
 Gyrophaena boleti (Linnaeus, 1758) g
 Gyrophaena brevicollis Seevers, 1951 i c g
 Gyrophaena bucranium Pace, 2007 g
 Gyrophaena californica (Casey, 1906) i c g
 Gyrophaena caputserpentis Pace, 2007 g
 Gyrophaena caseyi Seevers, 1951 i c g
 Gyrophaena caucasica A.Strand, 1939 g
 Gyrophaena chippewa Seevers, 1951 i c g
 Gyrophaena compacta Casey, 1906 i c g
 Gyrophaena congrua Erichson, 1837 g
 Gyrophaena coniciventris Casey, 1906 i c g
 Gyrophaena criddlei Casey, 1911 i c g
 Gyrophaena deprehendens Pace, 2007 g
 Gyrophaena draconis Pace, 2007 g
 Gyrophaena dybasi Seevers, 1951 i c g
 Gyrophaena egena Casey, 1906 i c g
 Gyrophaena fasciata (Marsham, 1802) g
 Gyrophaena flammula Pace, 2007 g
 Gyrophaena flavicornis Melsheimer, 1844 i c g b
 Gyrophaena foraminis Pace, 2007 g
 Gyrophaena franciscana Seevers, 1951 i c g
 Gyrophaena frosti Seevers, 1951 i c g
 Gyrophaena fuscicollis Casey, 1906 i c g
 Gyrophaena gaudens Casey, 1906 i c g
 Gyrophaena geniculata Méklin, 1853 g
 Gyrophaena gentilis Erichson, 1839 g
 Gyrophaena gerhardi Seevers, 1951 i c g
 Gyrophaena gilvicollis Casey, 1906 i c g
 Gyrophaena gomyi Pace, 1984 g
 Gyrophaena gracilis Seevers, 1951 i c g
 Gyrophaena guadelupensis Pace, 1987 g
 Gyrophaena hanseni Strand, 1946 g
 Gyrophaena huachucae Seevers, 1951 i c g
 Gyrophaena illiana Seevers, 1951 i c g
 Gyrophaena indiana Seevers, 1951 i c g
 Gyrophaena insolens Casey, 1906 i c g
 Gyrophaena involuta Casey, 1906 i c g
 Gyrophaena joyi Wendeler, 1924 g
 Gyrophaena joyioides Wüsthoff, 1937 g
 Gyrophaena kangasi Rutanen, 1994 g
 Gyrophaena kansana Seevers, 1951 i c g
 Gyrophaena kaunshanchiensis Pace, 2007 g
 Gyrophaena keeni Casey, 1911 i c g
 Gyrophaena korbi A.Strand, 1939 g
 Gyrophaena kuanensis Pace, 2007 g
 Gyrophaena laetula Casey, 1906 i c g
 Gyrophaena laurana Casey, 1906 i c g
 Gyrophaena lobata Casey, 1906 i c g
 Gyrophaena longispinosa Seevers, 1951 i c g
 Gyrophaena lucidula Erichson, 1837 g
 Gyrophaena manca Erichson, 1839 g
 Gyrophaena meduxnekeagensis Klimaszewski & Webster, 2009 g
 Gyrophaena michigana Seevers, 1951 i c g
 Gyrophaena microanmashanicola Pace, 2007 g
 Gyrophaena minima Erichson, 1837 g
 Gyrophaena minimostruosa Pace, 2007 g
 Gyrophaena mirantennalis Pace, 2007 g
 Gyrophaena modesta Casey, 1906 i c g
 Gyrophaena monstruosa Pace, 2007 g
 Gyrophaena monticola Casey, 1906 i c g
 Gyrophaena munsteri Strand, 1935 g
 Gyrophaena nana (Paykull, 1800) i c g
 Gyrophaena nanoides Seevers, 1951 i c g
 Gyrophaena neomexicana Seevers, 1951 i c g
 Gyrophaena neonana Seevers, 1951 i c g
 Gyrophaena nitidula (Gyllenhal, 1810) g
 Gyrophaena obesula Casey, 1906 i c g
 Gyrophaena obsoleta Ganglbauer, 1895 g
 Gyrophaena orientalis Strand, 1938 g
 Gyrophaena pectinis Pace, 2007 g
 Gyrophaena peniculi Pace, 2007 g
 Gyrophaena pileusmeni Pace, 2007 g
 Gyrophaena piscatrix Pace, 2007 g
 Gyrophaena polita (Gravenhorst, 1802) g
 Gyrophaena poweri Crotch, 1866 g
 Gyrophaena pseudocriddlei Klimaszewski & Webster, 2009 g
 Gyrophaena pseudonana Strand, 1939 g
 Gyrophaena pulchella Heer, 1839 g
 Gyrophaena pulli Pace, 2007 g
 Gyrophaena rhodeana Casey, 1906 i c g
 Gyrophaena rousi Dvořák, 1966 g
 Gyrophaena rufa Melsheimer, 1844 i c g
 Gyrophaena rugipennis Mulsant & Rey, 1861 g
 Gyrophaena sculptipennis Casey, 1906 i c g
 Gyrophaena sierrae Seevers, 1951 i c g
 Gyrophaena simpliciformis Seevers, 1951 i c g
 Gyrophaena simulans Seevers, 1951 i c g
 Gyrophaena spatulata Seevers, 1951 i c g
 Gyrophaena stella Pace, 2007 g
 Gyrophaena strictula Erichson, 1839 g
 Gyrophaena stroheckeri Seevers, 1951 i c g
 Gyrophaena subnitens Casey, 1906 i c g
 Gyrophaena taeniae Pace, 2007 g
 Gyrophaena taiwacicatricosa Pace, 2007 g
 Gyrophaena taiwaculeifera Pace, 2007 g
 Gyrophaena taiwainopinata Pace, 2007 g
 Gyrophaena taiwanana Pace, 2007 g
 Gyrophaena taiwanensis Pace, 2007 g
 Gyrophaena taiwanova Pace, 2007 g
 Gyrophaena taiwaspinosa Pace, 2007 g
 Gyrophaena tenebrosa Casey, 1906 i c g
 Gyrophaena tonensis Pace, 2007 g
 Gyrophaena transversalis Strand, 1939 g
 Gyrophaena uteana Casey, 1906 i c g
 Gyrophaena vitrina Casey, 1906 i c g
 Gyrophaena williamsi Strand, 1935 g
 Gyrophaena wisconsinica Seevers, 1951 i c g

Data sources: i = ITIS, c = Catalogue of Life, g = GBIF, b = Bugguide.net

References

Gyrophaena
Articles created by Qbugbot